Ajak is a fictional character appearing in American comic books published by Marvel Comics. Created by Jack Kirby, Ajak first appeared in The Eternals #2 (August 1976), he was created by Jack Kirby. The character is usually depicted as a member of the Eternals, a human offshoot race in the Marvel Universe, and as a member of the God Squad. 

The Marvel Cinematic Universe film Eternals featured Ajak portrayed by actress Salma Hayek.

Publication history
Ajak first appeared in The Eternals #2 (August 1976), and was created by Jack Kirby.

Fictional character biography
Ajak is a member of the Polar Eternals, a band of the near-immortal Eternals whose outpost lay within the Ural Mountains of Russia. Ajak’s earliest known interactions with humanity occurred in Babylon around 2500 BC when he was among the Eternals who clashed with the Deviants and their leader, Warlord Kro. Around 1200 BC, Ajak and his brother Arex were active in Greece where they were known respectively as Ajax the Greater and Ajax the Lesser. Around 1000 AD, Ajak interacted with the natives of South America in the region of Perú where he assumed the identity of the Incan god Tecumotzin and the Aztec god Quetzalcoatl as he used the Eternals’ advanced knowledge to assist them. When the Celestials who created the Eternals and Deviants visited Perú around that time as part of their Third Host, Ajak performed the role of communicator with them, imparting messages from the Host to the Eternals, even delivering a warning from the Celestials to the gods of Earth. With Zuras, Ajak arranged the flight plan the Celestials used to leave Earth. After the Third Host departed Ajak placed himself into suspended animation deep in the Inca Ruins high in the Andes Mountains alongside a team of Eternals who were his assistants within the City of the Space Gods, which had been constructed in Perú for the Celestials’ use.

In his first appearance The Eternals #2 (Aug. 1976), Ajak and his men were awakened from their slumber by fellow Eternal Ikaris just in time to greet the Fourth Host of the Celestials. Ajak once again served as communicator and befriended the human archaeologist Dr. Daniel Damian, revealing many of the secrets of the City of the Space Gods to him. Ajak was sealed with Doctor Damian behind the force barrier surrounding the site of the Fourth Host's arrival. Ajak was attacked by agents of S.H.I.E.L.D., who were converted to stored atoms by the Celestials after their failed escape attempt, and was known for battling an Incan wrestler. The Celestials ultimately judged in Earth’s favor and departed. Soon after, Ajak was among the party of Eternals who assumed the form of the psychic Uni-Mind entity to explore other worlds. Ajak eventually returned to the City of the Space Gods, but while he was away Damian’s daughter Margo had been slain by the Deviants. Blaming the Eternals and Deviants for her death, Damian used Celestial technology to transform Ajak into a monster and sent him to slay Deborah y Thomas Ritter, the offspring of Kro and Thena. Although the children were saved and Ajak was returned to normal, he had killed other children in his hunt and was haunted by their deaths and the betrayal of Damian. Ajak chose to disintegrate himself, destroying Damian in the process.

"Secret Invasion"
In the 2008 "Secret Invasion" storyline, Ajak leaves to join Hercules' "God Squad" to battle the Skrull gods, not only to defend Earth, but to gain a greater understanding of the Skrulls, in light of their being Deviants whose native people were also transformed by the Celestials, and to acquire a means to communicate with the Dreaming Celestial, whom only Makkari can communicate with. Thinking Hercules to be a bad leader, Ajak takes command of the God Squad from him just before they battle the Skrull Gods. Ajak is subsequently killed in the confrontation with the Skrull God Kly'bn.

Revenge against Makkari
Later, a revived Ajak and the other Eternals, continues the mission of awakening Eternals who no longer remember who they are and are living human lives, thanks to Sprite. During this time Ajak breeds resentment towards Makkari for being the Dreaming Celestial's chosen communicator, warning the other Eternals that the Dreaming Celestial is broken. While Ikaris and Druig's opposing forces race to awaken and convert as many "sleeping" Eternals as they can to their respective sides, Ajak locates the Eternal known as Gilgamesh, "The Forgotten One", in Peru, manipulating them into believing Ikaris' Eternals are actually Deviants. Ajak does not do this out of loyalty to Druig, but out of resentment towards Makkari. Gilgamesh ends up brutally killing Makkari, which Druig and Legba witness. Ajak then goes to Makkari's side and signals Sersi, telling her that it was Druig and his forces that killed Makkari. Ajak then continues to monitor the Dreaming Celestial while Ikaris and Druig's forces go to battle.

Sometime during these events, Ajak helps the Eternals battle the Young Gods, who have returned from the Celestial's ship. Ajak mainly watches the battle from Olympia, reveling in the Young Gods' defeat of Makkari, but when Makkari is about to be killed, Ajak chooses to intervene, believing even an Eternal such as Makkari deserves better than death at the hands of "these blasphemers." It is assumed Ajak has gone back to monitoring the Dreaming Celestial.

Death
Later, when the Celestials' Final Host arrived on Earth, Ajak, along with all the Eternals, killed themselves after realizing the true purpose for which they were created.

Powers and abilities
Ajak possesses the standard Eternal abilities of cosmic energy manipulation and complete control of one's own cellular makeup. The physical control granted gives Eternals an indefinitely prolonged lifespan and cellular regeneration along with superhuman strength and durability, in addition to cosmic powers granting them flight, teleportation and the ability to fire energy bolts. It was revealed in Gaiman's miniseries Eternals that Ajak possesses the ability to directly communicate with the Celestials when they are nearby.

Reception

Accolades 

 In 2021, CBR.com ranked Ajak 3rd in their "15 Most Powerful Eternals" list.

In other media

Television
 Ajak appears in Marvel Knights: Eternals, voiced by Kirby Morrow.

Film
 A female version of Ajak appears in Eternals, portrayed by Salma Hayek. In this version, she was the genetically altered Eternal leader who was sent with other Eternals to Earth to save humanity from the dangerous Deviants. Ajak and the others remained on Earth for centuries until the group disbanded to continue their lives. She met with Ikaris to ask for his help to stop Tiamut, a Celestial who would destroy the planet. Ikaris betrayed her because of his loyalty to Arishem, causing Ajak to be killed by the Deviants that he threw her towards. Before she died, Ajak chose Sersi as her replacement. Arishem was later informed of what happened to Ajak by Sersi.
 In November 2021, Salma Hayek stated she had signed on for multiple MCU films, possibly returning as Ajak in future productions.

References

External links
 
 Ajak at MarvelDirectory.com
 Sersi's Loft's entry on Ajak 

Characters created by Jack Kirby
Comics characters introduced in 1976
Eternals (comics)
Fictional characters with superhuman durability or invulnerability
Marvel Comics characters who can move at superhuman speeds
Marvel Comics characters who can teleport
Marvel Comics characters with accelerated healing
Marvel Comics characters with superhuman strength
Marvel Comics superheroes